The Roman Catholic Diocese of Wewak is  a suffragan diocese of the Roman Catholic Archdiocese of Madang. It was elevated to a diocese in 1966.

Bishops

Bishops of Wewak
Camisio Teodoro Gellings, SS.CC. (1913−1918) 
Adalberto Ottone Rielander, SS.CC.(1918−1922) 
Teodosio Heikenrath, (1922-1923)
Giuseppe Lörks, S.V.D. (1928−1945) 
Leo Clement Andrew Arkfeld, S.V.D. (1948−1975) 
Raymond Kalisz, S.V.D. (1980−2002)
Anthony Joseph Burgess (2002−2013)
Józef Roszyński, S.V.D. (2015–present); was Polish religious missionary priest in the Diocese; consecrated and installed 25 April 2015

Coadjutor bishop
Anthony Joseph Burgess (2000-2002)

Other priests of this diocese who became bishops
Michael Marai, appointed Bishop of Goroka in 1988
Cherubim Alfred Dambui, appointed Auxiliary Bishop of Port Moresby in 2000
Otto Separy, appointed Auxiliary Bishop of Aitape in 2007

See also
Catholic Church in Oceania

References

External links and references

Wewak